Thales Nederland B.V. (formerly Hollandse Signaalapparaten B.V. or in short Signaal) is a subsidiary of the French multinational company Thales Group based in the Netherlands.

The firm was founded as NV Hazemeyer's Fabriek van Signaalapparaten during 1922 by Hazemeyer and Siemens & Halske to produce naval fire-control systems. During the Second World War, the company's factory was captured and pillaged by the German Army; shortly after the conflict's end, the remaining assets were nationalised by the Dutch government, the company being renamed N.V. Hollandsche Signaalapparaten (or Signaal for short). During 1956, the Netherlands-based electronics company Philips became the majority owner of Signaal after buying a large portion of the shares from the government. The firm expanded throughout much the Cold War period, producing various naval electronics and defense systems for a range of customers around the world.

During 1990, the French electronics and defence contractor Thomson-CSF acquired Signall from Philips; accordingly, Signaal was rebranded as Thomson-CSF Signaal. Following the renaming of Thomson-CSF to Thales in 2000, Thomson-CSF Signaal was renamed Thales Nederland. Presently, the company is primarily involved in naval defence systems, such as sensors, radars and infrared systems. Other areas of business include air defence, communications, optronics, cryogenic cooling systems and navigation products.

History

The company was founded during 1922 in the city of the Hengelo, in the Netherlands as NV Hazemeyer's Fabriek van Signaalapparaten by Hazemeyer and Siemens & Halske. Initially specialising in the development of naval fire-control systems, the company was established in the Netherlands was a means of getting around the restrictions imposed by the Treaty of Versailles on Germany; there was a specific stipulation forbidding any German company from manufacturing military equipment. The first major contract to be secured by the company was for the production of the fire control systems of the HNLMS Sumatra and HNLMS Java, two of the Royal Netherlands Navy's Java-class light cruisers. Throughout the interwar period, the firm expanded rapidly, gaining customers in overseas nations such as Sweden, Spain and Greece.

During May 1940, amid the turbulent world events of the Second World War, the company's factory was captured virtually intact by the German Army, having invaded the country during the Battle of the Netherlands. A high proportion of the firm's employee were able to escape to the United Kingdom, where many applied their expertise with radar and fire control systems on behalf of the Allies. Following the Liberation of the Netherlands and the end of the conflict, most chose to return to the country; the factory itself having been pillaged and left derelict by the Germans.

In the immediate postwar years, the Dutch government, being aware of the company's value as a part of its wider defence industry, decided to intervene, nationalising the company along with its remaining asserts, after which it operated under the name N.V. Hollandsche Signaalapparaten (or Signaal for short). During the late 1940s, replacement  buildings and facilities were erected and new staff was recruited. In this period of reestablishment, several valuable technologies and new systems were developed in fields such as radar, fire control systems, computers and air traffic control apparatus.

During 1956, a large portion of shares in the company were purchased from the Dutch government by the Netherlands-based electronics company Philips, making it the majority owner of Signaal. Over the following decades, the business developed various new product lines. During 1975, Signaal began development of what would become the Goalkeeper CIWS,  an autonomous short-range defensive weapon system; it would develop and produce the Goalkeeper for over five decades. In the latter part of the 1980s, another defense subsidiary of Philips, named Usfa, was partially merged with Signaal, becoming known as Signaal USFA.

Throughout the latter half of the twentieth century, the firm continued to expand, opening up multiple factories across the Netherlands. By the end of the Cold War, Signaal had expanded to the point where it had customers in 35 countries and in excess of 5,000 employees. However, the Cold War's demise had led to hefty cuts in many nation's defence budgets, which had in turn caused a downturn in customer demand for Signaal, compelling the company to reorganise itself and to reduce its level of staffing.

During 1990, Philips decided that it no longer wanted to pursue defence as a core activity of its portfolio; thus Signaal was sold on to the French electronics and defence contractor Thomson-CSF. Accordingly, Signaal was rebranded as Thomson-CSF Signaal.

Following the acquisition, various new systems, largely focused upon defence equipment and combat management tools, were developed. It has continued to specialise in the production of integrated naval command and control, sensor, and communications systems, along with ground-based air defense systems, telecommunications equipment, and training services to customers across the world. Shortly following the renaming of Thomson-CSF to Thales during 2000, Thomson-CSF Signaal was renamed Thales Nederland. Since then, the company has continued to expand and seek new opportunities for business. During May 2001, aerospace company EADS Germany and Thales Nederland established a joint venture, ET Marinesysteme, based in Wilhelmshaven, Germany, to develop and produce naval combat systems. The company has been involved in various other projects with EADS, which has since been rebranded as the Airbus Group.

Products

Naval Systems & Sensors
 TACTICOS- Combat Management System
 NS100 4D- Naval Air and Surface surveillance 3D AESA radar 
 SMART-L-EWC - 3D multibeam radar.
 I-Mast - housing that accommodates all major radars, sensors and antennas of a naval vessel
 Goalkeeper CIWS - autonomous and completely automatic weapon system for short-range defense.
 Gatekeeper - Staring Electro-Optic security system
 Smart-S MK2 multi beam radar

Land Defence & C4I
 Sotas Solutions - vehicle communications
 SQUIRE Ground Surveillance Radar - man-portable medium-range ground surveillance radar

Transportation
 OV-chipkaart - national chipcard system for public transport in the Netherlands

References

External links
 

Defence companies of the Netherlands
Electronics companies of the Netherlands
Hengelo
Radar manufacturers
Thales Group divisions and subsidiaries